Cítov is a municipality and village in Mělník District in the Central Bohemian Region of the Czech Republic. It has about 1,200 inhabitants.

Administrative parts
The village of Daminěves is an administrative part of Cítov.

References

Villages in Mělník District